Ålandstidningen or Tidningen Åland is a Swedish-language newspaper in Åland, an autonomous region in Finland. It is published six times a week with a circulation of 8,392, and is the largest local newspaper on Åland, of the two published (the other being Nya Åland). Tidningen Åland was founded in 1891 by Julius Sundblom, who would later play an instrumental part in the Åland Crisis.

References

External links
Ålandstidningen

1891 establishments in Finland
Daily newspapers published in Finland
Mass media in Åland
Newspapers established in 1891
Swedish-language newspapers published in Finland